was a district located in Niigata, Japan.

As of 2003, the district had an estimated population of 19,638 and a density of 45.60 persons per km2. The total area was 430.64 km2.

History

The district was founded when the former Kubiki District split into Higashikubiki District, Nakakubiki District, and Nishikubiki District. At the time of founding, the district covered the eastern portion of the city of Jōetsu (the sections of Maki, Ōshima, Uragawara and Yasuzuka) and the western portion of the city of Tōkamachi (the sections of Matsudai and Matsunoyama).

Recent mergers
 On January 1, 2005 - The town of Yasuzuka, and the villages of Maki, Ōshima and Uragawara, along with the towns of Itakura, Kakizaki, Ōgata and Yoshikawa, the villages of Kiyosato, Kubiki, Nakagō and Sanwa (all from Nakakubiki District), and the town of Nadachi (from Nishikubiki District), were merged into the expanded city of Jōetsu.
 On April 1, 2005 - The towns of Matsudai and Matsunoyama, along with the town of Kawanishi, and the village of Nakasato (both from Nakauonuma District), were merged into the expanded city of Tōkamachi. Higashikubiki District was dissolved as a result of this merger.

See also
 List of dissolved districts of Japan

Former districts of Niigata Prefecture